Dr Robert Craig Maclagan FRSE FRCPE (6 March 1839 – 12 July 1919) was a Scottish physician, anthropologist and author from the Maclagan family. He was co-founder of the Scottish Association for the Medical Education of Women.

Life

He was born in Edinburgh on 6 March 1839 the son of Elizabeth Allan Thomson and her husband, Andrew Douglas Maclagan, a surgeon. He lived his early years at 129 George Street in Edinburgh’s New Town. He was educated at the Edinburgh High School then studied medicine at the University of Edinburgh graduating with an MD in 1860.

In 1869 he was elected a Fellow of the Royal Society of Edinburgh his proposer being Sir Robert Christison.

Alongside his medical career he was a military volunteer and held the rank of Colonel with the 5th Battalion Royal Scots. In a further disconnected field (other than through writing) from 1873 he was Partner and Chairman of A. B. Fleming & Co, one of the world’s largest ink manufactures, based in Granton in northern Edinburgh.

He died on 12 July 1919 at home at 5 Coates Crescent in Edinburgh’s West End, where he had lived for at least 40 years. He is buried with his family in Dean Cemetery in west Edinburgh. The grave lies on the north wall of the original cemetery, backing onto the first north extension.

Publications

The Arsenic Eaters of Styria (BMJ 1864)
The Clan of the Bell of St Fillan (1879)
Scottish Myths (1882)
The Games and Diversions of Argyleshire (1901)
Evil Eye in the Western Highlands (1902)
Our Ancestors: Scots, Picts and Cymry (1913)
Religio Scotica

Family

He was father to Douglas Philip Maclagan WS (1867–1948).

References

1839 births
1919 deaths
Writers from Edinburgh
Alumni of the University of Edinburgh
Fellows of the Royal Society of Edinburgh
19th-century Scottish people
19th-century Scottish medical doctors
Scottish folklorists
Scottish non-fiction writers
Royal Scots officers
Burials at the Dean Cemetery
People educated at the Royal High School, Edinburgh
Medical doctors from Edinburgh